General elections were held in Denmark on 8 December 1981. The Social Democratic Party remained the largest in the Folketing, with 59 of the 179 seats. Voter turnout was 83% in Denmark proper, 55% in the Faroe Islands and 61% in Greenland.

Results

References

Elections in Denmark
Denmark
1981 elections in Denmark
December 1981 events in Europe